The Ahl Rachida is an Arabian tribe, also called Ouled Sidi Yaakoub. The tribe is also of Shorfa origin, which means they are descendant of the Islamic prophet. This tribe enjoyed great influence in the region when it comes to culture and art. 

According to writings Ahl Rechida down from Beni Rached, originating in Algeria Mazouna; after a period marked by political unrest, they entered the service of Marinids (13th century) for permission to settle in Morocco.

See also
 Arab tribes
 North African Arabs
 Maghreb
 Jebala people

Other tribes 
 Zaër 
 Abda 
 Beni Hassan 
 Maqil 
 Beni Khirane

References

Arab tribes in Morocco
Arab tribes in Algeria